Late Night Tales: BadBadNotGood is a mix album compiled by Canadian band BadBadNotGood. It was released on July 28, 2017 as part of the Late Night Tales series.

The mix features music from Stereolab, Erasmo Carlos, Donnie and Joe Emerson, and Thundercat.

Critical reception
Late Night Tales: BadBadNotGood received "universal acclaim" reviews from contemporary music critics. At Metacritic, which assigns a normalized rating out of 100 to reviews from mainstream critics, the album received an average score of 85, based on 6 reviews.

Track listing

Charts

References

2017 compilation albums
BadBadNotGood
BadBadNotGood albums